Jaysinghrao Mansinghrao Ghorpade  (2 October 1930 – 29 March 1978) was an Indian cricketer who played in eight Test matches from 1953 to 1959.

External links
 

1930 births
1978 deaths
India Test cricketers
Indian cricketers
Baroda cricketers
Indian Universities cricketers
West Zone cricketers
People from Satara district
Cricketers from Maharashtra